Mayssa Bastos (born 23 October 1997) is a Brazilian submission grappler and black belt Brazilian jiu-jitsu competitor. Bastos has won almost every single major jiu-jitsu tournaments in both Gi and No-Gi. She is the current roosterweight World Champion, World No-Gi Champion, Pan American Champion and the light-featherweight European Champion.

Early life 
Mayssa Caldas Pereira Bastos was born on 23 October 1997, in Niterói, Brazil. As a child she trained in Judo alongside her older brother before she started Brazilian jiu-jitsu at the age of eleven at a Grappling Fight Team (GFT) school under coach Jair Court in Maricá, Rio de Janeiro. Bastos also visited another school location in Méier to train with legendary 7th-degree coral belt Julio Cesar. As a blue belt she won double gold at both the IBJJF Juvenile Pan-American and at the European Championship; before earning her purple belt she won silver at the Juvenile World championship. As a purple belt Bastos won two world championships as well as the European and the Pan Championships in both 2015 and 2016. As a brown belt Bastos won the Abu Dhabi World Pro, followed by UAEJJF Grand Slam Abu Dhabi and UAEJJF Grand Slam Los Angeles. She then won the European Open, the Pan-American Championship and earned bronze at the 2017 World Championship.

To prepare for her fights outside of Brazil, Bastos started training with Murilo Santana at Unity JJ in New York City as well as at GF Team Orange County on the west coast. She was promoted to black belt on 4 June 2018 by Júlio César right after winning silver at the 2018 World Championship in the brown belt division.

Black belt career 
At the 2019 World Championship Bastos won her first title as a black belt, defeating four time world champion Rikako Yuasa in the final. By the age of 23 Bastos had won almost every single major jiu-jitsu tournaments in both GI and No-GI, for most of them more than once. Bastos won three consecutive No-Gi World title without having lost a single No-Gi match as a black belt.

In 2021 she won FloGrappling's Who's Number One Championship in the  division after defeating Grace Gundrum and the Eddie Bravo Invitational (EBI) becoming its first straw-weight champion. Competing under ADCC rules for the first time, in February 2022  Bastos won the ADCC Submission Fighting 2nd South American Trials in the −60 kg division. At the 2022 European Championship, Bastos defeated Checkmat’s Rose El Sharouni in the final to become European Champion in the light feather weight division (−53.5 kg), that same year Bastos qualified for the 2022 ADCC World Championship after winning the 2nd South American Trials and won the Pan Championship for the third time. In June of the same year she became World Champion for the third time after defeating Brenda Larissa via points (6–4).

Bastos competed in the 2023 IBJJF European Championship, winning gold in the light-featherweight division.

Brazilian Jiu-Jitsu competitive summary 
Main Achievements (Black Belt)
 3 x IBJJF World Champion (2019 / 2021 / 2022)
 3 x IBJJF Pans Champion (2019–2020–2022)
 IBJJF Asian Open Champion (2018)
 4 x IBJJF European Open Champion (2019–2020–2022-2023)
 IBJJF American Nationals Champion (2018)
 3 x IBJJF World No-GI Champion (2018 / 2019 / 2021)
 2 x IBJJF Pans Championship No-Gi Champion (2018–2021)
 AJP Abu Dhabi World Pro Champion (2017 / 2018 / 2019)
 AJP Grand Slam winner, Moscow (2019)
 AJP Grand Slam winner, Tokyo (2018)
 AJP Grand Slam winner, Miami (2020–2021)
 AJP Grand Slam winner, Rio De Janeiro (2018)
 ADCC 2nd South American Trials winner (2022)
 CBJJ Brazilian Nationals No-Gi Champion (2018)
 2nd Place IBJJF Pan Championship (2021)
 2nd Place CBJJ Brazilian Nationals Championship (2019)

Main Achievements (Coloured Belts)
  IBJJF World Champion (2015–2016 purple)
  IBJJF World Champion Juvenile (2014 blue)
  IBJJF European Open Champion(2015–2016 purple, 2017–2018 brown)
  IBJJF Pans Champion (2015–2016 purple, 2018 brown)
  IBJJF European Open Juvenile Champion(2014 blue)
  IBJJF Pans Championship Juvenile Champion(2014 blue)
  UAEJJF Abu Dhabi World Pro (2018 brown/black)
  UAEJJF Grand Slam, Abu Dhabi (2018 brown)
  UAEJJF Grand Slam, Los Angeles (2017 brown)
  UAEJJF South America Continental Pro (2018 brown)
  2nd place IBJJF World Championship (2018 brown)
  2nd place IBJJF European Open (2015 purple)
  2nd place IBJJF World Championship Juvenile (2014 blue)
  3rd place IBJJF World Championship (2018/2017 brown)
  3rd place IBJJF European Open (2016 purple, 2017 brown)
  3rd place IBJJF Pans Championship (2016 purple)

Instructor lineage 
Luis França > Oswaldo Fadda > Monir Salomão > Júlio César > Mayssa Bastos

Notes

References 

Brazilian practitioners of Brazilian jiu-jitsu
Living people
1997 births
People awarded a black belt in Brazilian jiu-jitsu
Female Brazilian jiu-jitsu practitioners
Brazilian submission wrestlers
World No-Gi Brazilian Jiu-Jitsu Championship medalists
Brazilian jiu-jitsu world champions (women)
People from Niterói